PT Thiess Contractors Indonesia is a subsidiary of Thiess Pty Ltd, which is a wholly owned subsidiary of CIMIC Group.

History
Thiess originally commenced operations in Indonesia in 1972 when it acquired a 50% in Petrosea. After Thiess was taken over by CSR in 1980, the overseas operations including Indonesia operations were sold to Leighton Contractors.

Thiess re-entered the Indoneasian market when Thiess Contractors Indonesia was established in 1988 and, working in a joint venture with PT Mintekindo Utama Into, started undertaking mining activities. Its first major mining contract was awarded in March 1989 by BHP at Senakin Mine in East Kalimantan.

Ownership
Thiess Pty Ltd hold a 99% shareholding in Thiess Contractors Indonesia.

References

Further reading
 Priest, Joan (1997). The Thiess Story. Boolarong Press.
 Raymond, Robert (1999). A Vision for Australia: The Snowy Mountain Scheme 1949-1999. Focus Publishing Pty Ltd.
 King, Stephanie (1999). Leighton: 50 Years of Achievement 1949-1999. Technical Resources Pty Ltd.

Mining companies of Indonesia
Coal companies of Indonesia
Oil and gas companies of Indonesia
Construction and civil engineering companies of Indonesia
Construction and civil engineering companies established in 1988
Indonesian companies established in 1988
Energy companies established in 1988